Owen Owen was a Liverpool-based operator of department stores in the United Kingdom and Canada. Beginning with a drapery shop in Liverpool, a chain of department stores was built up, often by taking over rival retailers. The company remained under Owen / Norman family control until the 1980s, and the brand ceased to be used in 2007.

Founder and early history
Owen Owen was born on 13 October 1847 at Cwmrhaeadr near Machynlleth at the westernmost tip of Montgomeryshire, Wales. His family were hill farmers. Welsh agriculture had prospered during the Napoleonic Wars when imports of food were restricted but, after the war, there was such a severe depression that in 1838 the farm which had been their home for generations had to be mortgaged and the following year sold.  Owen Owen was the first child of his father's second wife, but she died after giving birth to her sixth child when Owen Owen was only eight. His mother had a brother, Samuel, who needed help to run his draper's shop in Bath; so Owen Owen went to Bath and his uncle gave him both a home and an education.  He was educated at the Wesleyan College, Taunton, and started working at his uncle's shop in 1860.

In 1868, at the age of 20, with some help from Uncle Samuel, Owen Owen opened his own draper's emporium at 121 London Road, Liverpool, close to where his father's brother, Robert, had had a shop at number 93. By 1873 Owen Owen had over 120 employees, many from Wales, and a quarter of an acre of floor space.  Owen Owen was interested in his staff's well-being.  Besides being the first employer in Liverpool to give staff a half day off each week, he also set up a trust fund for retired employees.  In the 1880s he began investing in other enterprises including railways, and in 1889 became director of Evans & Owen Ltd in Bath, the shop started by his uncle.  He moved to London in 1891, after marrying, but continued to manage the Liverpool store which became one of the largest stores in the north of England.  He also invested in many other stores and estates. Owen's daughter went onto marry into the Liverpool based family of Norman, and it was under Duncan Norman, and then his son John, who would lead the company from the 1920s.

In his private life he was an active supporter of many Welsh organisations.  He died of cancer in London on 27 March 1910 at the age of 62.

Expansion and collapse 
Owen Owen opened a drapery shop at 121 London Road, Liverpool. Over the years the store expanded, but in the 1920s when the city's retail focus moved away from the London Road area, the Owen family lent the company the money to move to a better position on Clayton Square where a large purpose-built department store (originally designed as a luxury hotel) was erected. The company then purchased rival chain T J Hughes, after a visit by then chairman Duncan Norman and moved that firm's Liverpool store into the empty London Road premises.

Owen Owen expanded by building a store in Coventry in 1937, which was bombed during World War II, and purchasing Frederick Matthews in Preston. After the war it continued to expand, purchasing G W Robinson Ltd in Canada during 1951, and adding other stores to the UK portfolio while the Coventry and Southampton store were rebuilt.

A subsidiary company, Plumb (Contract Furnishers and Shopfitters) Ltd., was created from its own shopfitting department and had offices at Bishop Street, Coventry and Kempston Street, Liverpool. By 1979 the business operated 19 department stores branded either Owen Owen or under their original name but taglined as an Owen Owen store. It also operated three T J Hughes stores in the UK, and seven G W Robinson stores in Canada.

In the 1980s the Owen family sold the business. G W Robinson was sold in 1982 to Canadian businessman Joseph Segal and John Levy, while T J Hughes was split off as a separate entity. In 1991 the firm purchased several Lewis's stores from administration (not to be confused with John Lewis) and was known briefly under the business name of 'Lewis's Owen Owen', before being taken over by Philip Green in 1994.

In 1995 Green launched the brand Kid's HQ in four of his Lewis's and Owen Owen Stores. The company was then stripped of its assets, which included the closure of the flagship Liverpool branch of Owen Owen, and was cut from twelve stores to one, Lewis's of Liverpool, following the sale of many stores to other chains including Allders and Debenhams.

In early 2005, Philip Green sold his stake in the business to David Thompson who began a new phase of expansion at Owen Owen, acquiring Joplings and Robbs from the Merchant Retail Group and purchasing Esslemont & MacIntosh from the Esslemont family. The Owen Owen brand name was no longer used, but remained the name of the operating company.

On 28 February 2007 Owen Owen entered administration. One of the reasons given for the company's demise was the disruption caused by the Big Dig, a series of regeneration projects in Liverpool city centre. The Esslemont & MacIntosh store at Aberdeen was closed on 5 May 2007. In the same month the Liverpool, Hexham and Sunderland stores were sold as a going concern to Vergo Retail Ltd., controlled by the previous owner of Owen Owen, David Thompson, and enabling the stores to continue to trade.

Former branches and subsidiaries

Owen Owen
Liverpool
Basingstoke, The Malls, opened 1981
Bath, formerly James Colmer, the name being retained on cast window frames and glass panels in hoardings. Purchased 1973; closed 1991; ground floor and partial 1st floor redeveloped as multiple outlets, remainder converted to flats.
Birkenhead, opened 1959; converted to a TJ Hughes
Brighton, formerly Wades, purchased 1975, closed 1981
Bristol, formerly James Colmer store closed 1973
Chester, formerly Richard Jones. Purchased 1960, closed 1999. Food Hall formerly known as William Jones (the Three Old Arches store), which was a separate business, and then amalgamated into one store.
Colwyn Bay, formerly W S Wood. Purchased 1975, closed 1981.
Coventry, City Centre. Opened 1937, destroyed in 1940 blitz, rebuilt 1954
Crawley opened 1992
Doncaster, purchased from Verity & Sons in 1950, sold to Binns in 1975
Erdington, formerly W M Taylor & Sons, purchased 1971, closed 1977
Evesham, formerly Hamilton & Bell, purchased 1975, closed 1982
Finchley, formerly Priors, purchased 1963, closed 1993
Hereford, Commercial Street, opened 1975, closed 1979
Ilford, Exchange Shopping Centre, opened 1991
Ipswich, Buttermarket, opened 1992
Kidderminster, formerly Attwoods, purchased 1975, transferred to T J Hughes
Newport, formerly Reynolds, purchased 1975, closed 1989
Preston, formerly Frederick Matthews, purchased 1937, closed 1989
Redditch, Kingfisher Centre, opened 1980
Richmond, formerly Wright Brothers, purchased in 1976 from House of Fraser, closed 1990
Shrewsbury, formerly Maddox & Co, purchased 1966, closed 1990
Slough, formerly Suters, purchased 1978
Southampton, formerly E Mayes & Son, purchased 1949, closed 1994
Stourbridge, formerly Stringers; purchased 1975, closed 1990, demolished 1995. The building started life as a cinema which closed in 1973 and was converted to Stringers.
Taunton, formerly Clements & Brown, purchased 1973, closed 1979
Uxbridge, formerly Suters, purchased 1978, closed 1998
Weston-super-Mare, formerly B T Butter, purchased 1978, closed 1993
Wolverhampton opened 1968. The store later operated as TJ Hughes it was demolished and rebuilt for Debenhams (closed 2020).

T J Hughes
 Liverpool, London Road
 Birkenhead (changed from an Owen Owen to a T J Hughes)
 Blackpool opened 1946, closed 1971
 Bootle opened 1968
 Kidderminster transferred from Owen Owen
 Leicester opened 1967, closed 1969
 St. Helens opened 1988
 Wolverhampton transferred from Owen Owen

Lewis's
Purchased in 1991.
Liverpool
Hanley, Stoke-on-Trent
Leeds
Leicester
Manchester
Oxford

Other department stores
Aberdeen, Esslemont & Macintosh, purchased 2005, closed 2007
Hexham, Robbs, purchased 2005
Southport, Boothroyds, purchased 1990, closed 1993
Southport, Broadbents, purchased 1990, closed 1993 
Sunderland, Joplings, purchased 2005

Former G W Robinson stores in Canada
Burlington Centre, Burlington, Ontario
Centre Mall, Hamilton, Ontario
James Street South, Hamilton, Ontario
Eastgate Square, Hamilton, Ontario
Lime Ridge Mall, Hamilton, Ontario
The Pen Centre, St. Catharines
Niagara Square Shopping Centre, Niagara Falls, Ontario
Conestoga Mall, Waterloo, Ontario

The Owen Owen Trust Fund 
The trust fund continues as a registered charity, supporting those who were formerly employed by any company in the Owen Owen group, together with their spouses and dependents.

References

Sources 
 David Wyn Davies: Owen Owen: Victorian Draper (Gwasg Cambria, Aberystwyth, 1983)

External links
The Owen Owen Trust
Owen Owen Liverpool at Flickr
Owen Owen Finchley at Flickr

Buildings and structures in Liverpool
Debenhams
Defunct companies based in Liverpool
Defunct retail companies of the United Kingdom
Defunct department stores of the United Kingdom
British companies disestablished in 2007
Allders
British companies established in 1868
Retail companies disestablished in 2007
Retail companies established in 1868